Badri–Kedar Legislative Assembly constituency was a part of Uttar Pradesh Legislative Assembly from 1974 to 2000. It became a part of Interim Uttarakhand Assembly from 2000 to 2002.

Members of Legislative Assembly

Key

See also
 Badrinath (Uttarakhand Assembly constituency)
 Kedarnath (Uttarakhand Assembly constituency)
 Chamoli district

References

Former assembly constituencies of Uttarakhand
Chamoli district